Marga Petersen (18 September 1919 in Bremen – 22 September 2002 in Ottersberg) was a German athlete who competed mainly in the sprints.

She competed for West Germany in the 1952 Summer Olympics held in Helsinki, Finland in the 4 × 100 metres where she won the silver medal with her teammates Ursula Knab, 80 metre hurdles bronze medalist Maria Sander and Helga Klein.

Book
 Petersen, Margarete, geb. Kalensee. Petersen, Margarete, geb. Kalensee. In: Frauen Geschichte(n), Bremer Frauenmuseum (Hg.). Edition Falkenberg, Bremen 2016.

References

1919 births
2002 deaths
Sportspeople from Bremen
West German female sprinters
Olympic athletes of Germany
Athletes (track and field) at the 1952 Summer Olympics
Olympic silver medalists for Germany
Medalists at the 1952 Summer Olympics
Olympic silver medalists in athletics (track and field)
Olympic female sprinters